Typhoon Nari, known in the Philippines as Typhoon Falcon, was a small but powerful typhoon which struck the Korean Peninsula in early September 2007.

Meteorological history

An area of disturbed weather developed northwest of Guam on September 10 and moved northwestward, slowly increasing in organisation. The Japan Meteorological Agency began monitoring the system as a tropical depression the next day. The depression continued to organise and strengthen, and the Joint Typhoon Warning Center issued a Tropical Cyclone Formation Alert on it during the afternoon of September 12, and began issuing advisories on Tropical Depression 12W an hour later. The JMA followed suit early on September 13 and initiated advisories on the system; PAGASA named the system Falcon shortly after. The depression continued to intensify, and the JMA upgraded it to Tropical Storm Nari later that morning. The storm then underwent rapid intensification that afternoon and evening, strengthening from a tropical depression to a typhoon in just 18 hours. The JMA upgraded Nari to a severe tropical storm late that afternoon, and by late that evening, Nari was upgraded to a typhoon. Nari reached its peak on September 14, and began weakening soon afterwards. It turned extratropical right after landfall in South Korea at tropical storm strength.

Preparations

Okinawa

On September 14, Japan Airlines cancelled 14 flights in and out of Okinawa, affecting an estimated 5,300 people. All Nippon Airways cancelled 54 flights, Ryukyu Air Commuter cancelled 24, Skymark cancelled two, and Japan Airlines cancelled an additional 16 flights the next day. An estimated 21,000 passengers cancelled their flights arrangements due to Nari. United States Marine bases located in Okinawa were placed under Tropical Cyclone Condition of Readiness-3 as Nari approached the islands on September 15. Aircraft and important equipment were secured to prevent damage to them. Several of the more important aircraft were transported to other locations throughout the Pacific. Working parties were scrambled to quickly assess and repair damage following the typhoon. About 30 marine soldiers were placed on "Typhoon Watch". They were to ride out the storm at the Foster headquarters building until Tropical Cyclone Condition of Readiness-1 had been sounded. At that time, they were to survey the area for signs of damage.

South Korea
At least 300 flights in and out of South Korea were cancelled due to Typhoon Nari. About 130 of the cancelled flights were from Jeju Island. An additional 3,000 ferries were also cancelled from the island. Several ports along the southern coast of South Korea were shut down due to the storm. Typhoon warnings were issued for most of the southern regions of the country.

Impact

Japan

Damage at the base was primarily limited to trees. The storm passed directly over Kumejima Island, producing a record  wind gust on the island. A pressure of 948.4 hPa (mbar) was recorded as the eye passed over. At least 4,500 residences were left without power throughout all the islands, most of which were on Kumejima. In Naha City, a wall collapsed due to the rain but caused no injuries. Cars were reportedly flipped over in Kumejima Town where the worst damage was dealt. Numerous buildings lost their windows and numerous trees were knocked down. The outer bands of Nari trigged flooding which killed three people and injured three others in Kyushu. Fourteen homes were destroyed, 22 were damaged, and 117 others were affected. A total of 1,247 hectares of farmland was either damaged or destroyed by the typhoon. At the height of the storm, 4,800 households were without power and 3,700 were without water. Damages from both prefectures amounted to ¥31.4 billion ($323 million USD).

South Korea
Throughout the country, a total of 479 structures were damaged or destroyed, displacing 948 people. The torrential rains submerged large areas of farmland and flooded roadways. The hardest hit area was Jeju Island, where rainfall amounted to a record . At least 12 people were killed on the island and damages amounted to ₩28 billion ($19.2 million USD).  In all, 20 people were killed and damages amounted to ₩65.2 billion (US$70 million).

Aftermath
Following Typhoon Nari, Jeju Island was declared a national disaster area by the South Korean government. Residents who lost 30 percent or more of their property were entitled to a nine-month extension to their tax deadlines. The government reported that they would cover about 90 percent of the costs for rehabilitation on the island.

See also

Typhoon Danas (2013)
Typhoon Sanba (2012)

References

External links

JMA General Information of Typhoon Nari (0711) from Digital Typhoon
JMA Best Track Data of Typhoon Nari (0711) 
JMA Best Track Data (Graphics) of Typhoon Nari (0711)
JMA Best Track Data (Text)
JTWC Best Track Data of Typhoon 12W (Nari)
12W.NARI from the U.S. Naval Research Laboratory

Typhoons in South Korea
2007 Pacific typhoon season
Typhoons in Japan
F
F
Typhoons
Nari